Versos is the ninth album by the Portuguese music composer António Pinho Vargas. It was released in 2001.

Track listing

Personnel
 Rui Taveira – vocals, alto saxophone and soprano saxophone (tracks 1–9)
 Jaime Mota – piano (tracks 1–9)
 Northern Sinfonia, conducted by Baldur Brõnimann (tracks 10–13)
 Paulo Ferreira – baritone (tracks 14–20)
 Jaime Mota – piano (tracks 14–20)

References

António Pinho Vargas albums
2001 albums